Henri Thomas (27 December 1905 – 18 April 1937) was a French racing cyclist. He rode in the 1928 Tour de France.

References

1905 births
1937 deaths
French male cyclists
Place of birth missing